Ashley Louis Baron-Cohen, also known mononymously as Ash, is an English filmmaker. He has a bachelor's degree in experimental psychology from University of Sussex, and trained as a filmmaker at the Pasadena Art Center. He currently resides in Los Angeles.

Baron-Cohen is known for such films as Bang and This Girl's Life.

While in film school, he persuaded Richard Harris to leave the set of Clint Eastwood's Unforgiven to star in his student film for free.

Filmography
 Bang – 1995
 Pups – 1999
 The Blind Bastards Club – 2002
 Little Warriors – 2002
 This Girl's Life – 2003
 The Confession – 2005
 Radioactive – 2009
 Novella – 2009

Awards
 1997 – Bang – Top Ten Movies of the Year – Roger Ebert
 1997 – Bang – Top Ten Movies of the Year – Los Angeles Times
 1997 – Bang – Spirit Award Nominee – Best Newcomer
 1999 – Stockholm Film Festival – Nominated for "Bronze Horse" Award for Pups
 2000 – Cognac Festival du Film Policier – Won "New Blood" Award for Pups
 2000 – Yubari International Fantastic Film Festival – Won "Special Jury Prize" for Pups
 2005 – Little Warriors – U.S. TV Guide Winner – Outstanding Biographical Program

Personal life
His siblings include the academic Simon Baron-Cohen and the playwright Dan Baron Cohen. He is the cousin of actor and comedian Sacha Baron Cohen.

Ash is legally blind without his contact lenses.

References

External links
 

1967 births
Living people
English people of Belarusian-Jewish descent
English people of German-Jewish descent
English film producers
English Jews
English male screenwriters
English screenwriters
Alumni of the University of Sussex
Ash